Roger Stephen Burdick (born June 23, 1947) is an American attorney and jurist who served as a justice of the Idaho Supreme Court from 2003 to 2021. He was chief justice twice for a total of eight years; from 2011 to 2015, and 2017 through 2020.

Early life and education 
Born in Boulder, Colorado, Burdick moved around the United States in his youth, eventually settling in Boise, Idaho. He graduated from Boise High School in 1965 and the University of Colorado in Boulder in 1970, earning a bachelor's degree in finance. After a year as a bank examiner for the state of Idaho, Burdick earned a Juris Doctor from the University of Idaho College of Law in 1974.

Idaho Supreme Court 
Burdick was appointed to the Idaho Supreme Court by Governor Dirk Kempthorne in 2003 to fill the vacancy of the retiring Jesse Walters. He retained his seat in statewide elections in 2004 (unopposed), 2010 (58.4%), and 2016 (unopposed).

Elected chief justice by his fellow justices in 2011, Burdick did not seek a second term in 2015 and was succeeded by Jim Jones in August. Following Jones' retirement, he became chief justice again in 2017 and served through 2020. In February 2021, Burdick announced his upcoming retirement from the court at the end of June.

References

External links
Roger Burdick

|-

|-

1947 births
Living people
21st-century American judges
Chief Justices of the Idaho Supreme Court
Justices of the Idaho Supreme Court
People from Boise, Idaho
Politicians from Boulder, Colorado
University of Colorado alumni
University of Idaho College of Law alumni